Movileni is a commune in Iași County, Western Moldavia, Romania. It is composed of four villages: Iepureni, Larga-Jijia, Movileni and Potângeni.

Natives
 Ioanel Sinescu

References

Communes in Iași County
Localities in Western Moldavia